Jean Keyrouz (born 1931) is a Lebanese alpine skier. He competed at the 1956 Winter Olympics and the 1964 Winter Olympics.

References

1931 births
Living people
Lebanese male alpine skiers
Olympic alpine skiers of Lebanon
Alpine skiers at the 1956 Winter Olympics
Alpine skiers at the 1964 Winter Olympics
Place of birth missing (living people)